The urbilaterian (from German ur- 'original') is the hypothetical last common ancestor of the bilaterian clade, i.e., all animals having a bilateral symmetry.

Appearance

Its appearance is a matter of debate, for no representative has been (or may or may not ever be) identified in the fossil record. Two reconstructed urbilaterian morphologies can be considered: first, the less complex ancestral form forming the common ancestor to Xenacoelomorpha and Nephrozoa; and second, the more complex (coelomate) urbilaterian ancestral to both protostomes and deuterostomes, sometimes referred to as the "urnephrozoan".  Since most protostomes and deuterostomes share features — e.g. nephridia (and the derived kidneys), through guts, blood vessels and nerve ganglia— that are useful only in relatively large (macroscopic) organisms, their common ancestor ought also to have been macroscopic.  However, such large animals should have left traces in the sediment in which they moved, and evidence of such traces first appear relatively late in the fossil record — long after the urbilaterian would have lived.  This leads to suggestions of a small urbilaterian (around 1 mm) which is the supposed state of the ancestor of protostomes, deuterostomes and acoelomorphs.

Dating the urbilaterian
There are earlier, controversial fossils: Vernanimalcula has been interpreted as a bilaterian, but may simply represent a fortuitously infilled bubble. Fossil embryos are known from around the time of Vernanimalcula, but none of these have bilaterian affinities. This may reflect a genuine absence of bilateria, however it is likely this is the case as bilateria may not have laid their eggs in sediment, where they would be likely to fossilise.

Molecular techniques can generate expected dates of the divergence between the bilaterian clades, and thus an assessment of when the urbilaterian lived.  These dates have huge margins of error, though they are becoming more accurate with time.  More recent estimates are compatible with an Ediacaran bilaterian, although it is possible, especially if early bilaterians were small, that the bilateria had a long cryptic history before they left any evidence in the fossil record.

Characteristics of the urbilaterian

Eyes
Light detection (photosensitivity) is present in organisms as simple as seaweeds; the definition of a true eye varies, but in general eyes must have directional sensitivity, and thus have screening pigments so only light from the target direction is detected. Thus defined, they need not consist of more than one photoreceptor cell.

The presence of genetic machinery (the Pax6 and Six genes) common to eye formation in all bilaterians suggests that this machinery - and hence eyes - was present in the urbilaterian. The most likely candidate eye type is the simple pigment-cup eye, which is the most widespread among the bilateria.

Since two types of opsin, the c-type and r-type, are found in all bilaterians, the urbilaterian must have possessed both types - although they may not have been found in a centralised eye, but used to synchronise the body clock to daily or lunar variations in lighting.

Complex or simple?
Proponents of a complex urbilaterian point to the shared features and genetic machinery common to all bilateria.  They argue that (1) since these are similar in so many respects, they could have evolved only once; and (2) since they are common to all bilateria, they must have been present in the ancestral bilaterian animal.

However, as biologists' understanding of the major bilaterian lineages increases, it is beginning to appear that some of these features may have evolved independently in each lineage.  Further, the bilaterian clade has recently been expanded to include the acoelomorphs — a group of relatively simple flatworms. This lineage lacks key bilaterian features, and if it truly does reside within the bilaterian "family", many of the features listed above are no longer common to all bilateria. Instead, some features — such as segmentation and possession of a heart — are restricted to a sub-set of the bilateria, the deuterostomes and protostomes.  Their last common ancestor would still have to be large and complex, but the bilaterian ancestor could be much simpler. However, some scientists stop short of including the acoelomorph clade in the bilateria.  This shifts the position of the cladistic node which is being discussed; consequently the urbilaterian in this context is farther out the evolutionary tree and is more derived than the common ancestor of deuterostomes, protostomes and acoelomorphs.

Genetic reconstructions are unfortunately not much help. They work by considering the genes common to all bilateria, but problems arise because very similar genes can be co-opted for different functions. For instance, the gene Pax6 has a function in eye development, but is absent in some animals with eyes; some cnidaria have genes which in bilateria control the development of a layer of cells that the cnidaria do not have. This means that even if a gene can be identified as present in the urbilaterian, we cannot necessary tell what the gene's function was.  Before this was realised, genetic reconstructions implied an implausibly complex urbilaterian.

Reconstructing the urbilaterian
The absence of a fossil record gives a starting point for the reconstruction — the urbilaterian must have been small enough not to leave any traces as it moved over or lived in the sediment surface. This means it must have been well below a centimetre in length.  As all Cambrian animals are marine, one can reasonably assume that the urbilaterian was too.

Furthermore, a reconstruction of the urbilateria must rest on identifying morphological similarities between all bilateria.  While some bilateria live attached to a substrate, this appears to be a secondary adaptation, and the urbilaterian was probably mobile.  Its nervous system was probably dispersed, but with a small central "brain". Since acoelomorphs lack a heart, coelom or organs, the urbilaterian probably did too — it would presumably have been small enough for diffusion to do the job of transporting compounds through the body. A small, narrow gut was probably present, which would have had only one opening — a combined mouth and anus. 
Functional considerations suggest that the surface of the bilaterian was probably covered with cilia, which it could have used for locomotion or feeding.

 there is still no consensus on whether the characteristics of the deuterostomes and protostomes evolved once or many times.  Features such as a heart and a blood-circulation system may therefore not have been present even in the deuterostome-protostome ancestor, which would mean that this too could have been small (hence explaining the lack of fossil record).

See also

References

External links 
 Solène Song, Viktor Starunov, Xavier Bailly, Christine Ruta, Pierre Kerner, Annemiek J. M. Cornelissen, Guillaume Balavoine: Globins in the marine annelid Platynereis dumerilii shed new light on hemoglobin evolution in bilaterians. In: BMC Evolutionary Biology Vol. 20, Issue 165. 29 December 2020. doi:10.1186/s12862-020-01714-4. See also:
 A single gene 'invented' haemoglobin several times . On: EurekAlert! 29 December 2020. Source: CNRS

Evolution of animals
Ediacaran life
Evolutionary biology
Last common ancestors